The Journal of Happiness Studies: An Interdisciplinary Forum on Subjective Well-Being is a peer-reviewed interdisciplinary scientific journal covering the study of happiness and well-being. It was established in 2000 by founding editors Ed Diener, Alex Michalos, and Ruut Veenhoven. It is published by Springer Science+Business Media, and is affiliated with the International Society for Quality of Life Studies (ISQOLS). The editor-in-chief is Antonella Delle Fave (University of Milan). According to the Journal Citation Reports, the journal has a 2020 impact factor of 3.852.

References

External links

Publications established in 2000
Positive psychology journals
Springer Science+Business Media academic journals
English-language journals
Academic journals associated with international learned and professional societies